In Christianity, sin is an immoral act considered to be a transgression of divine law. The doctrine of sin is central to the Christian faith, since its basic message is about redemption in Christ.

Hamartiology, a branch of Christian theology which is the study of sin, describes sin as an act of offence against God by despising his persons and Christian biblical law, and by injuring others. Christian hamartiology is closely related to concepts of natural law, moral theology and Christian ethics. According to Augustine of Hippo (354–430) sin is "a word, deed, or desire in opposition to the eternal law of God," or as scripture states, "sin is the transgression of the law."

Among some scholars, sin is understood mostly as legal infraction or contract violation of non-binding philosophical frameworks and perspectives of Christian ethics, and so salvation tends to be viewed in legal terms. Other Christian scholars understand sin to be fundamentally relational—a loss of love for the Christian God and an elevation of self-love ("concupiscence", in this sense), as was later propounded by Augustine in his debate with the Pelagians. As with the legal definition of sin, this definition also affects the understanding of Christian grace and salvation, which are thus viewed in relational terms.

Etymology
Hamartiology (from Greek: ἁμαρτία, hamartia, "a departure fr. either human or divine standards of uprightness" and -λογια, -logia, "study")

In the Bible

Old Testament
The first use of sin as a noun in the Old Testament is of "sin is crouching at your door; it desires to have you, but you must rule over it" waiting to be mastered by Cain, a form of literary theriomorphism.<ref> Synthesis: bulletin du Comité national de littérature comparée / Comitetul Național pentru Literatură Comparată, Institutul de Istorie și Teorie Literară "G. Călinescu." – 2002 "Sin is personified as (an animal?) which "crouches" at the door of Cain (Gen 4:7). As Gerhard von Rad (Genesis, 105) remarks, 'The comparison of sin with a beast of prey lying before the door is strange, as is the purely decorative use"</ref>

The first use of sin as a verb is when God appears to Abimelech in a dream "Then God said to him in the dream, “Yes, I know you did this with a clear conscience, and so I have kept you from sinning against me.

The Book of Isaiah announced the consequences of sin: "But your iniquities have separated you from your God; your sins have hidden his face from you, so that he will not hear. For your hands are stained with blood, your fingers with guilt. Your lips have spoken falsely, and your tongue mutters wicked things" — a separation between God and man, and unrequited worshipping.

Original sin

Original sin is the Christian doctrine that humans inherit a tainted nature and a proclivity to sin through the fact of birth. Theologians have characterized this condition in many ways, seeing it as ranging from something as insignificant as a slight deficiency, or a tendency toward sin yet without collective guilt, referred to as a "sin nature", to total depravity or automatic guilt of all humans through collective guilt.

Christians believe the doctrine of humanity's state of sin resulted from the fall of man, stemming from Adam's rebellion in Eden, namely the sin of disobedience in consuming from the tree of knowledge of good and evil.

The concept of original sin was first alluded to in the 2nd century by Irenaeus, in his controversy with certain dualist Gnostics. Other church fathers such as Augustine also developed the doctrine, seeing it as based on the New Testament teaching of Paul the Apostle ( and ) and the Old Testament verse of .Are Babies Born with Sin?  – Topical Bible Studies. Retrieved 13 October 2013. Tertullian, Cyprian, Ambrose and Ambrosiaster considered that humanity shares in Adam's sin, transmitted by human generation. Augustine's formulation of original sin was popular among Protestant reformers, such as Martin Luther and John Calvin, who equated original sin with concupiscence, affirming that it persisted even after baptism and completely destroyed freedom. The Jansenist movement, which the Catholic Church declared to be heretical, also maintained that original sin destroyed freedom of will.

Augustine taught that God holds all the descendants of Adam and Eve accountable for Adam's sin of rebellion, and as such all people deserve God's wrath and condemnation – apart from any actual sins they personally commit.

In contrast, Pelagianism states that humans enter life as moral "blank slates" (tabulae rasae) responsible for their own moral nature. The Fall that occurred when Adam and Eve disobeyed God affected humankind only minimally as it established a negative moral precedent.

A third line of thinking takes an intermediate position, asserting that since the Fall the sin of Adam has naturally affected human beings such that they have inborn tendencies to rebel against God (in which rebellion by personal choice all accountable humans, except Jesus and, to Catholics, Mary, will choose or have chosen to indulge). This is the hamartiological position of the Eastern Christian churches, often called ancestral sin as opposed to original sin, but it is sometimes viewed as Semi-Pelagianism in the West, especially by the Reformed.

Generational sin
This concept implicates that "unresolved issues get handed down from generation to generation", but that "Jesus is the bondage breaker...[and] He is able to break the cycle of this curse, but only if we want Him to." Theologian Marilyn Hickey explicates this concept, teaching that  references "the unseen and mysterious connection between a father's sins and the path of his children"; she provides an example in which if a "father is a liar and a thief, his children are prone to the same behavior". Hickey states that "Through the power of Jesus Christ, no generational curses need remain in our family lineage" and says that prayer is efficacious in ending the cycle of ancestral sin. James Owolagba adds that in addition to prayer, frequent church attendance including regular reception of the sacraments, especially Holy Communion, aids in delivering an individual from generation sin.

Divisions

Sin can be divided by reason of:
 gravity: mortal and venial;
 state of the conscience: formal and material;
 act or state: actual and habitual;
 person offended: sins against God, against neighbor, against self;
 manner: commission, omission;
 manifestation: internal, external;
 author: original and non-original (personal, actual);
 attention: deliberate, half-deliberate;
 cause: ignorance, fragility, malice;
 special disorder: sins against the Holy Ghost and sins that cry to Heaven for vengeance;
 proper or improper;
 psychological fertility: capital sins.

 Catholic views 

 Thomas Aquinas 

The way Thomas Aquinas viewed sin and vices was radically different from later approaches, especially that of 17th-century moral theology. He presented sin and vices as contraries of virtues. He discusses the subject in his Summa Theologica part Ia–IIae (Prima secundae) qq. 71–89.

In one of his definitions of sin Thomas quotes Augustine of Hippo's description of sin as "a thought, words and deed against the Eternal Law."' 

To recognise the possibilities of sin in man is equal to acknowledge his human nature, his control and mastery of his own actions. Sin is a motion to the goal, it is judged by the object to which it is directed. The field of sin is the same as the field of virtue. There are three major fields: relationship with God, with oneself and with the neighbour. Thomas distinguished between mortal and venial sins. Mortal sin is when a person has irreparably destroyed the very principle of his/her order to the goal of life. Venial sin is when he/she has acted in a certain disordered way without destructing that principle:

According to Aquinas the gravity of sin depends also on "some disposition of the agent" (cf. STh I–II q. 18, aa. 4, 6). Sin, venial by reason of its object, may become mortal. It happens when person fixes his/her ultimate happiness, the last end of his/her life (Lat. finis ultimus) in the object of that venial sin. When venial sin is used as a way to provoke mortal sin it becomes mortal as well, e.g. when someone uses empty conversation or a chat to seduce someone to commit adultery. Also sin, mortal by reason of its object, may become venial because of the agent's disposition when his/her evil act does not have full moral capacity, i.e. is not deliberated by reason. That may happen for instance when sudden movements of unbelief arise in the mind. (Cf. STh I–II q.72 a.5).

The difference and gravity of sins may be discerned on the grounds of spirit and flesh, even mortal sins may differ in gravity. Carnal sins like lust, adultery or fornication, gluttony and avarice, because the person who commits them is inordinately directed towards material goods that are a serious matter, are mortal sins. They may cause much shame and infamy. But spiritual sins like blaspheming of God or apostasy are, according to Thomas, still greater evil, as they have more of the aversion from God. They are directed against a greater object. The formal, essential element of sin is more at the centre in them. (cf. STh I–II q.72 a.2)Farrell, pp. 255–272

According to another formulation of the concept of sin in the Summa, at the heart of sin is "the turning away from the immutable good", i.e. God, and "inordinate turning to mutable good", i.e. creatures. (STh I–IIae q.87 a.4) This cannot be understood as if in the concrete sinful deed the sinner commits two separate and independent acts. Both aversio and conversio constitute one single guilty action. At the root of the inordinate turning to the creatures is self-love which expresses itself in disordered desire (cupiditas) and rebellion towards God (superbia).

Speaking about sloth (Lat. acedia) Thomas points out that every deed which "by its very nature is contrary to charity is a mortal sin". An effect of such deed is the destruction of "spiritual life which is the effect of charity, whereby God dwells in us." Sin of a mortal character is always committed with the consent of reason: "Because the consummation of sin is in the consent of reason"'. (cf. STh II–IIae q.35 a.3) Venial and mortal sins can be compared to sickness and death. While venial sin impairs full healthy activity of a person, mortal sin destroys the principle of spiritual life in him/her.

 Catechism 
Catholic doctrine distinguishes between personal sin (also sometimes called "actual sin") and original sin. Personal sins are either mortal or venial.

Mortal sins are sins of grave (serious) matter, where the sinner performs the act with full knowledge and deliberate consent. (cf. Catechism of the Catholic Church (1857) The act of committing a mortal sin destroys charity, i. e. the grace in the heart of a Christian; it is in itself a rejection of God (Catechism of the Catholic Church (1855). If left un-reconciled, mortal sins may lead to eternal separation from God, traditionally called damnation.

Venial sins are sins which do not meet the conditions for mortal sins. The act of committing a venial sin does not cut off the sinner from God's grace, as the sinner has not rejected God. However, venial sins do injure the relationship between the sinner and God, and as such, must be reconciled to God, either through the Sacrament of Reconciliation or receiving the Eucharist (after proper contrition fulfilled).

Both mortal and venial sins have a dual nature of punishment. They incur both guilt for the sin, yielding eternal punishment in the case of mortal sins and temporal punishment for the sin in the case of both venial and mortal sins. Reconciliation is an act of God's mercy, and addresses the guilt and eternal punishment for sin. Purgatory and indulgences address the temporal punishment for sin, and exercise of God's justice.

Roman Catholic doctrine also sees sin as being twofold: Sin is, at once, any evil or immoral action which infracts God's law and the inevitable consequences, the state of being that comes about by committing the sinful action. Sin can and does alienate a person both from God and the community. Hence, the Catholic Church's insistence on reconciliation with both God and the Church itself.

The Roman Catholic view of sin has recently expanded. Monsignor Gianfranco Girotti, Regent of the Catholic Apostolic Penitentiary, has said that "known sins increasingly manifest themselves as behavior that damages society as a whole," including, for example:
 "certain violations of the fundamental rights of human nature, through genetic manipulations [or experiments],"
 "drug [abuse], which weakens the mind and obscures intelligence,"
 "environmental pollution,"
 "abortion and pedophilia," and
 the widening social and economic differences between the rich and the poor, which "cause an unbearable social injustice" (accumulating excessive wealth, inflicting poverty). The revision was aimed at encouraging confession or the Sacrament of Penance.

Mortal sins, which are any severe and intentional actions that directly disobey God, are often confused with the seven deadly sins, which are pride, envy, wrath, sloth, greed, gluttony, and lust. They are not, however, the same. The seven deadly sins are called "deadly" because they might lead another to commit other sins. Some forms of the seven deadly sins (i.e. debilitating one's health because of their love of food) can constitute as grave matter, while others may just be venal (i.e. over-eating).

Another group of four or five sins distinguished by the Church are the sins that cry to heaven: murder, sodomy, oppression of the weak, and defrauding the laborer.

 Reformed and Lutheran views 
Many Protestants of a Calvinist orientation teach that, due to original sin, humanity has lost any and all capacity to move towards reconciliation with God (Romans 3:23;6:23; Ephesians 2:1–3); in fact, this inborn sin turns humans away from God and towards themselves and their own desires (Isaiah 53:6a). Thus, humans may be brought back into a relationship with God only by way of God's rescuing the sinner from his/her hopeless condition (Galatians 5:17–21; Ephesians 2:4–10) through Jesus' substitutionary atonement (Romans 5:6–8; Colossians 2:13–15; 1 Timothy 2:5–6). According to traditional Reformed theology and classical Lutheranism, Salvation is sola fide (by faith alone); sola gratia (by grace alone); and is begun and completed by God alone through Jesus (Ephesians 2:8,9). This understanding of original sin (Romans 5:12–19), is most closely associated with Calvinist doctrine (see total depravity) and Lutheranism. Calvinism allows for the relative or nominal "goodness" of humanity through God's common grace upon both those predestined to salvation and those predestined to damnation, upon the regenerate and the unregenerate.

This is in contrast to the Roman Catholic teaching that while sin has tarnished the original goodness of humanity prior to the Fall, it has not entirely extinguished that goodness, or at least the potential for goodness, allowing humans to reach towards God to share in the Redemption which Jesus Christ won for them. Some Protestants and Orthodox Christians hold similar views.

There is dispute about where sin originated. Some who interpret the king of Tyre in Ezekiel 28 as a symbol for Satan believe sin originated when Satan coveted the position that rightfully belongs to God. The origin of individual sins is discussed in James 1:14–15 – "14but each one is tempted when, by his own evil desire, he is dragged away and enticed. 15Then, after desire has conceived, it gives birth to sin; and sin, when it is full-grown, gives birth to death." (NIV)

 Defined types of sin 
Within some branches of Protestantism, there are several defined types of sin (as in Roman Catholicism):
 Original sin—Most denominations of Christianity interpret the Garden of Eden account in Genesis in terms of the fall of man. Adam and Eve's disobedience was the first sin man ever committed, and their original sin (or the effects of the sin) is passed on to their descendants (or has become a part of their environment). See also: total depravity.
 Concupiscence
 Venial sin
 Greed
 Lust
 Pride
 Mortal sin
 Eternal sin—Commonly called the Unforgivable sin (mentioned in ), this is perhaps the most controversial sin, whereby someone has become an apostate, forever denying themselves a life of faith and experience of salvation; the precise nature of this sin is often disputed.

 Methodist views 
The Wesleyan–Arminian theology of Methodism teaches that humans, though being born in total depravity, can turn to God as a result of prevenient grace and do good; this prevenient grace convicts humans of the necessity of the new birth (first work of grace), through which he is justified (pardoned) and regenerated. After this, to willfully sin would be to fall from grace. When the believer is entirely sanctified (second work of grace), his/her original sin is washed away.

Methodist theology firstly distinguishes between original sin and actual sin:

It further categorizes sin as being "sin proper" and "sin improper". Sins proper (or sin, properly so called) are those that are committed freely and willfully, which result in a loss of entire sanctification. Sins improper (or sin, improperly so called) are those in the "category of benign neglect, fruits of infirmity (forgetfulness, lack of knowledge, etc)". In traditional Methodist theology, these (improper) sins are not classified as sins, as explained by Wesley, "Such transgressions you may call sins, if you please: I do not, for the reasons above-mentioned." John Wesley explains the matter like this: "Nothing is sin, strictly speaking, but a voluntary transgression of a known law of God. Therefore, every voluntary breach of the law of love is sin; and nothing else, if we speak properly. To strain the matter farther is only to make way for Calvinism. There may be ten thousand wandering thoughts, and forgetful intervals, without any breach of love, though not without transgressing the Adamic law. But Calvinists would fain confound these together. Let love fill your heart, and it is enough!"If a person backslides through sin proper but later returns to God, he or she must repent and be entirely sanctified again, according to Wesleyan-Arminian theology. With regard to the penalty of sin, Methodist theology teaches:

 Actual sin 
The definition of sin is a vital doctrine to the Methodist Churches, especially those of the Holiness movement. Richard S. Taylor explains "Many, perhaps most, of the errors which have protruded themselves into Christian theology can be finally traced to a faulty conception of sin. Because someone's notions of sin were a bit off-color, his entire trend of reasoning was misdirected."

The Wesleyan Holiness movement, as part of the wider Methodist tradition, holds strongly to John Wesley's definition of sin:
"Nothing is sin, strictly speaking, but a voluntary transgression of a known law of God. Therefore, every voluntary breach of the law of love is sin; and nothing else, if we speak properly. To strain the matter farther is only to make way for Calvinism. There may be ten thousand wandering thoughts, and forgetful intervals, without any breach of love, though not without transgressing the Adamic law. But Calvinists would fain confound these together. Let love fill your heart, and it is enough!"The Church of the Nazarene defines sin as:"We believe that actual or personal sin is a voluntary violation of a known law of God by a morally responsible person. It is therefore not to be confused with involuntary and inescapable shortcomings, infirmities, faults, mistakes, failures, or other deviations from a standard of perfect conduct that are the residual effects of the Fall. However, such innocent effects do not include attitudes or responses contrary to the spirit of Christ, which may properly be called sins of the spirit. We believe that personal sin is primarily and essentially a violation of the law of love; and that in relation to Christ sin may be defined as unbelief."

The Wesleyan Holiness movement emphasizes the possibility of freedom from all sin, and the voluntary nature of actual sin. As explained by Charles Ewing Brown “Every sinner in the world today knows more or less clearly that he is doing wrong.” H. Orton Wiley, the premier Holiness theologian of the last 100 years, explains that in defining sin, “the power to obey or disobey is an essential element.” According to Phineas Bresee, the founder of the Nazarene Church, "A failure to distinguish between sin and infirmity, puts an undue emphasis upon sin, and has a tendency to discourage earnest seekers from pressing on to full deliverance form the carnal mind. Calling that sin which is not sin, opens the door to actual sinning.” The traditional view in Wesleyan-Arminian theology is that total ignorance eliminates the possibility of sin. As explained by Francis Asbury: "The transgressor must know the law and willfully act the transgressor, the law is a transcript of the divine nature.”

It is with this understanding of actual sin, that lead the Holiness movement to emphasize the necessity and possibility of living without committing sin. As J. A. Wood, one of the American leaders in the Welsyean-Holiness movement explains in his work, Perfect Love: “The Lowest type of Christian sinneth not and is not condemned. The minimum of salvation is salvation from sinning.” This leads D. S. Warner, the founder of the Church of God to conclude "Holiness writers and teachers, as far as my knowledge extends, uniformly hold up a sinless life, as the true test and Bible standard of regeneration."

 Original Sin 
Wesleyan-Arminian theology holds to the orthodox Christian doctrine of original sin. The Church of the Nazarene explains it as such:"We believe that original sin, or depravity, is that corruption of the nature of all the offspring of Adam by reason of which everyone is very far gone from original righteousness or the pure state of our first parents at the time of their creation, is averse to God, is without spiritual life, and inclined to evil, and that continually. We further believe that original sin continues to exist with the new life of the regenerate, until the heart is fully cleansed by the baptism with the Holy Spirit."This original sin remains after salvation and may only be removed by entire sanctification (the second work of grace or baptism with the Holy Spirit)."We believe that entire sanctification is that act of God, subsequent to regeneration, by which believers are made free from original sin, or depravity, and brought into a state of entire devotement to God, and the holy obedience of love made perfect. It is wrought by the baptism with or infilling of the Holy Spirit, and comprehends in one experience the cleansing of the heart from sin and the abiding, indwelling presence of the Holy Spirit, empowering the believer for life and service. Entire sanctification is provided by the blood of Jesus, is wrought instantaneously by grace through faith, preceded by entire consecration; and to this work and state of grace the Holy Spirit bears witness."Holiness adherents are known by their emphasis "on the belief that entire sanctification takes place instantaneously in a crisis experience."

 Eastern Christian views 
The (Chalcedonian) Eastern Orthodox Church as well as the (non-Chalcedonian) Oriental Orthodox use "sin" both to refer to humanity's fallen condition and to refer to individual sinful acts. In many ways the Eastern Orthodox Christian view of sin is similar to the Jewish, although neither form of Orthodoxy makes formal distinctions among "grades" of sins.

The Eastern Catholic Churches, which derive their theology and spirituality from same sources as the Eastern Orthodox and Oriental Orthodox, tend not to adhere to the Roman Catholic distinction between mortal and venial sin taught by the Latin Church. Like the Orthodox Churches, however, the Eastern Catholic Churches do make a distinction between sins that are serious enough to bar one from Holy Communion (and must be confessed before receiving once again) and those which are not sufficiently serious to do so. In this respect, the Eastern Tradition is similar to the Western, but the Eastern Churches do not consider death in such a state to automatically mean damnation to "hell."

Jehovah's Witnesses
Jehovah's Witnesses believe that sin is inherited, like a disease, and has been passed on from generation to generation of humans, beginning with Adam and Eve, whom Witnesses believe are real historical characters. They believe that it began with the Devil, and then with humans wanting to decide for themselves what was good and bad. They believe that at that very moment they lost perfection and began to die. Jehovah's Witnesses consider human beings to be souls, and so when a human dies due to sin, they believe that his soul dies as well. They believe that Jesus is the only human ever to have lived and died sinless.

 The Church of Jesus Christ of Latter-day Saints 
Members of the Church of Jesus Christ of Latter-day Saints believe that individuals are only responsible for the sins they personally commit. In their Articles of Faith the Church of Jesus Christ of Latter-day Saints teaches, "We believe that men will be punished for their own sins, and not for Adam's transgression." Latter-day Saints also believe that sin is the consequence of the Fall of Adam and Eve, and that all sin originates from Satan. They also believe that "little children" (meaning those under the age of 8, or “the age of accountability”), while capable of sinning, are not held accountable for their actions, and their sins are covered by the atonement of Jesus Christ. 

Atonement

In Christianity, it is generally understood that the death of Jesus was a sacrifice that relieves believers of the burden of their sins. However, the actual meaning of this precept is very widely debated. The traditional teaching of some churches traces this idea of atonement to blood sacrifices in the ancient Hebraic faith.

Christian theologians have presented different interpretations of atonement:
 Origen taught that the death of Christ was a ransom paid to Satan in satisfaction of his claim on the souls of humanity as a result of sin. This was opposed by theologians such as St. Gregory Nazianzen, who maintained that this would have made Satan a power equal to God.
 Irenaeus of Lyons taught that Christ recapitulated in himself all the stages of life of sinful man, and that his perfect obedience substituted for Adam's disobedience.
 Athanasius of Alexandria taught that Christ came to overcome death and corruption, and to remake humanity in God's image again.
 Augustine of Hippo said that sin was not a created thing at all, but was "privatio boni", a "taking away of good".
 Anselm of Canterbury taught that Christ's death satisfied God's offended sense of justice over the sins of humanity. God rewarded Christ's obedience, which built up a storehouse of merit and a treasury of grace that believers could share by their faith in Christ. This view is known as the satisfaction theory of atonement, the merit theory, or sometimes the commercial theory. Anselm's teaching is contained in his treatise Cur Deus Homo (Why God Became Human). Anselm's ideas were later expanded utilizing Aristotelian philosophy into a grand theological system by Thomas Aquinas in the 13th century, particularly in his Summa Theologica, which although initially inciting controversy eventually became official Roman Catholic doctrine.
 Pierre Abélard developed the view that Christ's Passion was God suffering with his creatures in order to show the greatness of his love for them, and the realization of this love in turn leads to repentance. It is often known as the moral influence theory of atonement and became central to more liberal strands of Christian theology.
 Martin Luther and John Calvin, leaders of the Protestant Reformation, owed much to Anselm's theory and taught that Christ, the only sinless person, was obedient to take upon himself the penalty for the sins that should have been visited on men and women. This view is a version of substitutionary atonement and is sometimes called the penal substitution view. It is derived from the Roman Catholic satisfaction theory of atonement, although it is not identical to that of Anselm. Calvin additionally advocated a doctrine of limited atonement, which teaches that the atonement extends and applies only to the sins of the eternally predestined elect rather than to the entire human race, whereas Anselm affirmed a general redemption for all humanity and denied that Christ received punishment for sins, although he made satisfaction to God.
 D.L. Moody once said, "If you are under the power of evil, and you want to get under the power of God, cry to Him to bring you over to His service; cry to Him to take you into His army. He will hear you; He will come to you, and, if need be, He will send a legion of angels to help you to fight your way up to heaven. God will take you by the right hand and lead you through this wilderness, over death, and take you right into His kingdom. That's what the Son of Man came to do. He has never deceived us; just say here; "Christ is my deliverer.""
 Arminianism has traditionally taught what is known as the governmental theory of atonement. Drawing primarily from the works of Jacobus Arminius and especially Hugo Grotius, the governmental theory teaches that Christ suffered for humankind so that God could forgive humans while still maintaining divine justice. Unlike the traditional Reformed perspective, this view states that Christ was not punished by God the Father in the place of sinners, for true forgiveness would not be possible if humankind's offences were already punished. Christ's suffering was a real and meaningful substitutionary atonement for the punishment humans deserve, but Christ was not punished on behalf of some or all of the human race. This view has prospered in traditional Methodism and all who follow the teachings of John Wesley, and has been detailed by, among others, 19th century Methodist theologian John Miley in his Atonement in Christ and 20th century Church of the Nazarene theologian J. Kenneth Grider in his Wesleyan-Holiness Theology. Variations of this view have also been espoused by 18th century Puritan Jonathan Edwards and 19th century revival leader Charles Grandison Finney.
 Karl Barth taught that Christ's death manifested God's love and his hatred for sin.
 Barbara Reid, a dissenting Roman Catholic feminist and Dominican nun, argues that commonly conceived atonement theologies are harmful, especially to women and other oppressed minorities. Other liberal and radical theologians have also challenged traditional views of atonement. (see collective salvation)
 Mary Baker Eddy, founder of the Christian Science movement, taught that atonement exemplifies our underlying spiritual unity with God, whereby we reflect divine Love (God): Christ's atonement reconciles man to God, not God to man .

See also
 Biblical law in Christianity
 Christian ethics
 Heaven (Christianity)
 Law of Christ
 Moral theology
 Reconciliation
 Sacraments (Catholic Church)

References

Sources
 
 

Bibliography

 Mc Guinness, I. Sin (Theology of), in: New Catholic Encyclopaedia, vol. XIII, (reprinted 1981), The Catholic University of America, Washington D.C., pp. 241–245.
 Rahner, Karl, Schoonberg, Piet. "Sin", in: Encyclopedia of Theology: A Concise Sacramentum Mundi . (1986) Tunbridge Wells, Kent, UK: Burns & Oates, pp. 1579–1590. 
 Farrell, Walter, A companion to the Summa vol. 2 – The Pursuit of Happiness (1985 /reprinted 2nd ed./) Westminster, Maryland – London: Christian Classics, Sheed & Ward,  (UK) 0-87061-119-4 (USA), p. 467.
 Pieper, Josef, The Concept of Sin (2001), translated by Edward T. Oakes SJ, South Bend, Indiana: St. Augustines Press, pp. 128.
 Pinckaers, Servais, The Sources of Christian Ethics, (translated from French by M. T. Noble O.P.), Washington, D.C., The Catholic University of America Press, 1995. Reprinted: Edinburgh: T&T Clark,  p. 489
 Sabourin, Leopold SJ, Sin, in: The Oxford Companion to the Bible (1993). Bruce M. Metzger, Michael D. Coogan (ed.) New York – Oxford: Oxford University Press, pp. 696.

 External links 

 Augustine of Hippo, Confessions Augustine of Hippo, On Christian DoctrineThomas Aquinas, Summa Theologica'' I–II q71: Of Vice and Sin Considered in Themselves
 Hamartiology (Philosophical Theology of Sin)

 
Sin
Point of view